Blindsight is a novel by American writer Robin Cook, published by G. P. Putnam's Sons in 1992. Like most of Cook's other work, it is a medical thriller. This story introduces New York City pathologist Laurie Montgomery as being new to the medical examiner's office. She uncovers a series of drug overdoses and gangland-style murders with a grisly twist.

Plot
An abnormal increase in the number of drug overdose cases makes Laurie seriously suspicious, and she starts investigating these cases. The going is, however, not as smooth for Laurie as the Chief Medical Examiner Harold Bingham is adamant that no further investigation needs to be done on these cases because of heavy political pressure related to the death of a young banker who is also the son of a Senatorial candidate. Laurie is asked to write off his death as a normal one, even though his is a clear case of drug overdose. Though, Laurie reluctantly agrees to this, she cannot stop herself from researching all these drug overdose cases and finding some common features. She discovers that all these cases are related to young, rich and successful people: the kind that normally would not be associated with such drug overdose cases.

At the same time, Lieutenant Lou Soldano is investigating what is behind a series of gangland-style murders. Lou meets Laurie, who is doing an autopsy for one of these cases. While they are involved only professionally, Lou is immediately smitten by Laurie's charm.

Meanwhile, Laurie's parents want her to marry Dr. Jordan Scheffield, a rich, self-contained ophthalmologist.

There is a separate track that involves Paul Cerino's hit men Angelo and Tony roaming around the city and killing people according to a "supply-demand" list that is given to them by Cerino.

Despite their mutual misunderstandings and many other hurdles, Laurie and Lou manage to crack down the case successfully. Their findings reveal a shocking organ trade related to the corneal surgeries that were done at the Manhattan General Hospital.

External links
  Official site for the book Blindsight

American thriller novels
1992 American novels
Novels by Robin Cook
Medical novels
Novels set in New York City